In enzymology, a thiamine-phosphate diphosphorylase is an enzyme that catalyzes the chemical reaction

2-methyl-4-amino-5-hydroxymethylpyrimidine diphosphate + 4-methyl-5-(2-phosphono-oxyethyl)thiazole  diphosphate + thiamine monophosphate

The two substrates of this enzyme are 2-methyl-4-amino-5-hydroxymethylpyrimidine diphosphate and 4-methyl-5-(2-phosphono-oxyethyl)thiazole; its two products are diphosphate and thiamine monophosphate.

This enzyme belongs to the family of transferases, specifically those transferring aryl or alkyl groups other than methyl groups.  This enzyme is on the biosynthetic pathway to thiamine.

Nomenclature 

The systematic name of this enzyme class is 2-methyl-4-amino-5-hydroxymethylpyrimidine-diphosphate:4-methyl-5-(2 -phosphoethyl)thiazole 2-methyl-4-aminopyrimidine-5-methenyltransferase. Other names in common use include
 thiamine phosphate synthase,
 thiamine phosphate pyrophosphorylase,
 thiamine monophosphate pyrophosphorylase, and 
 TMP-PPase.

Structural studies

References

Further reading 

 
 

EC 2.5.1
Enzymes of known structure